Benjamin "Coach" Wade (born September 18, 1971) is an American reality television personality best known for being a contestant on Survivor: Tocantins, Survivor: Heroes vs. Villains, and Survivor: South Pacific. He grew up in Knoxville, Tennessee and later moved to Susanville, California, to conduct the Susanville Symphony and pursue "adventures" in Hollywood.

Early life
Benjamin Wade grew up in Knoxville, Tennessee, the son of William and Cherri Wade. He attended Tyson Middle School and West High School in Knoxville. He began his musical career as a teenager, playing trumpet in the Knoxville Youth Symphony Orchestra and making appearances with the Indianapolis Symphony, the Knoxville Symphony, and the New York Metropolitan Opera. He majored in business administration at the University of Tennessee and graduated in 1993, before obtaining a master's degree in music education from the University of Nevada.

Soccer
In 1997, Wade was hired at Simpson University in Redding, California, to coach the women's soccer team. He then spent 13 years coaching collegiate soccer teams and ended up at Southwest Baptist University from 2005 to 2009. After his appearance on Survivor, Wade was fired as head women's soccer coach for the university. The university's athletic director Brent Good had fired Wade for not telling the school that he would be taking two months off in order to participate in Survivor. Good stated in an interview, "He [Wade] said he was going to be gone for a week...the week went beyond that, which went beyond that, which went beyond that." According to Good, Wade left the team with two weeks left in the season in October but did not return to the school until December. In 2010, he signed a contract to coach the men's soccer team at Lassen College, a community college located in Susanville. On December 10, 2013, Wade was hired as the first ever men's soccer head coach at Lake Tahoe Community College. After 20 years of coaching collegiate soccer he retired from that position in November 2015, to spend more time with his family. Wade has come out of retirement to take over the reins of the Redding Royals FC semi-pro soccer team, starting with the 2017 season.

Music

Wade was hired on with the Susanville Symphony in 2003. His main instrument was the trumpet. He has composed several classical music pieces and is the co-founder and current artistic director and conductor of the Susanville Symphony. In 2011, his ballet The Four Elements premiered. A documentary featuring the accomplishments of this organization is chronicled in Small Town Big Symphony, filmed by his brother Peter in 2006. Wade was also a teacher of music history at Lassen College.

Survivor

Tocantins
Wade was selected to participate on Survivor: Tocantins, the 18th season of the series, in 2009. Being one of the most controversial characters to ever play the game, he was recognized as the main antagonist of this season; however, Jeff Probst has stated he doesn't feel like Wade did anything to earn this reputation. While in the game, he gave nicknames to his fellow tribemates: James "J.T." Thomas, Jr., the "warrior", Stephen Fishbach, the "wizard", Tyson Apostol, the "assistant coach" (to which Apostol later wished to upgrade himself to "co-coach"), and himself, the "Dragon Slayer". These players together formed the "Warrior Alliance". Ultimately he made it to a fifth-place finish, and was the fifth member of the jury, as well, voting for Thomas to win the title of Sole Survivor.

Wade was perhaps most famous for telling his fellow castaways stories of adventure from his previous exploits as a professional kayaker. Such stories were chronicled in the book A Voyage Beyond Reason, written by Tom Gauthier, although many of these stories were revealed to have a rather casual relationship with reality.

Heroes vs. Villains
For the 20th season of the series, CBS brought back "heroes" and "villains" from previous seasons. Wade was selected to participate for the Villains tribe and was the ninth person voted off and the first member of the jury. During his time in the game, he was a part of the Villains majority alliance and had a close alliance and relationship with fellow Villain Jerri Manthey, leading some to believe that the two had a possible romantic connection. He appeared to be in the majority alliance on his tribe at the time of his elimination, but outsiders Sandra Diaz-Twine, who would be the eventual winner, and Courtney Yates managed to convince the alliance that he was not trustworthy, and he was sent to the jury in lieu of Yates. At the reunion, Wade mentioned that after watching this season and Tocantins, he realized how people viewed him, and decided that he did not want to be viewed as "The Dragon Slayer" anymore.

South Pacific
In 2011, Wade returned to Survivor for the third time in Survivor: South Pacific, as the self-styled 'Zen Slayer' and one of two returning contestants (the other being Ozzy Lusth). During the season, Wade was assigned to the Upolu tribe through random draw, gaining the friendship of Edna Ma on the first day. On the first night, he made an alliance with Sophie Clarke, Rick Nelson, Albert Destrade, and Brandon Hantz, who later revealed to Wade that he was Russell Hantz's nephew. Wade decided to trust Brandon Hantz, but still was wary of his outbursts. Wade and his four alliance members eliminated Christine Shields-Markoski, Stacey Powell and Mikayla Wingle, sending them all to Redemption Island. At camp, Wade found the Hidden Immunity Idol with the help of Destrade and Clarke, keeping it a secret from Hantz and Ma. Later on, Wade staged the Idol's "discovery" for Hantz, under the guise of a prayer ritual. The tribes merged with six members each, prompting Wade to attempt to sway former Savaii member John Cochran over in order to avoid a tie. Wade's alliance, now including Cochran, voted off the remaining Savaiis. Both Cochran and Ma, knowing that they were on the outside of the alliance, tried to get Wade to betray his original alliance; however, he decided against it. He went on to vote off Cochran first, followed by Ma. Wade, Clarke and Destrade ended up in the Final Three, and Wade finished second place only to Clarke, who won in a 6–3–0 vote.

Post-Survivor 
Coach Wade was inducted to the Survivor Hall of Fame in 2015. In September 2020, Coach Wade was ranked the "20th Greatest Survivor" by former castaway Russell Hantz.

Personal life
Wade married Jessica Newton, a dance studio owner, on December 31, 2011. Together, they have two children, daughter Lenna (born May 8, 2014) and Bekston (born October 13, 2016), and one more child from Newton's previous relationship, Avvan (born February 28, 2009).

Filmography

Television

Bibliography
 No Turning Back: The South American Expedition of a Dragon Slayer; Shapato Publishing Co. (2011),

References

External links
Benjamin Wade biography for Survivor: Tocantins at CBS.com
Susanville Symphony

1971 births
21st-century trumpeters
American classical trumpeters
American male trumpeters
American male conductors (music)
American soccer coaches
American women's soccer coaches
College men's soccer coaches in the United States
Kayakers
Living people
People from Knoxville, Tennessee
People from Lassen County, California
Southwest Baptist Bearcats women's soccer coaches
Survivor (American TV series) contestants
University of Tennessee alumni
21st-century American conductors (music)
21st-century American male musicians
Simpson Red Hawks women's soccer coaches
University of Nevada alumni